Henry A. Biesiot (born 1945) is a former American football player and coach. He was the head football coach at Dickinson State University, a position he had held since the 1976 season before retiring following the 2013 season.  Biesiot was one of the few  college football coaches with over 200 career wins and 30 seasons of experience at the collegiate level.  In 2006, he was inducted into the National Association of Intercollegiate Athletics (NAIA) Hall of Fame as a coach.

Playing career
Biesiot was considered a "standout" player of both football and baseball while a student at Mayville State University.

Coaching career
Biesiot is the former head football coach for the Dickinson State Blue Hawks located in Dickinson, North Dakota.  In 2013, he finished his 38th seasons in that capacity, a streak that began in 1976.  As of September 27, 2013, his coaching record at Dickinson State is 257 wins, 115 losses, and 1 tie. This ranks him #1 at Dickinson State in total wins and #2 at the school in winning percentage.

As a coach, he has led his team to the NAIA playoffs a total of 14 times, advancing as far as the semifinals in 1991. His career playoff record was 6-14. His team concluded the 2010 regular season with an overall record of 8–1, 6–1 in conference play.

Biesiot earned his 250th career victory on October 30, 2010 with a 45–13 conference victory over rival Minot State.

Biesiot also was the head coach for the Blue Hawk baseball program from 1976 to 2001

Academics
Biesiot is a retired Associate Professor of Health and Physical Education at Dickinson State.  He earned a Bachelor of Science from Mayville State University and a Master of Science from the University of North Dakota.

NAIA career wins leader
Biesiot was involved in a chase to the top of the record books for all time wins by an NAIA coach. Biesiot won all of his victories with one school, Dickinson State University, which played NAIA football during his entire tenure.  Kevin Donley has more overall wins, but his record has been attained while coaching four different football programs, one of which was not in the NAIA.

Head coaching record

College football

See also
 List of college football coaches with 200 wins
 List of college football coaches with 100 losses

References

1945 births
Living people
Mayville State Comets baseball players
Mayville State Comets football players
Dickinson State Blue Hawks baseball coaches
Dickinson State Blue Hawks football coaches
High school football coaches in North Dakota
University of North Dakota alumni
People from Dickinson, North Dakota
Sportspeople from Duluth, Minnesota
Players of American football from Duluth, Minnesota